Odensberg is a locality situated in Falköping Municipality, Västra Götaland County, Sweden. It had 287 inhabitants in 2010.

References 

Populated places in Västra Götaland County
Populated places in Falköping Municipality